Abduqahhor Hojiakbarov (born 18 July 1989) is an Uzbekistan international footballer, who plays as a defender for AGMK.

Career statistics

International

As of match played 29 January 2012.

References

1989 births
Living people
Uzbekistani footballers
Uzbekistan international footballers
FC Bunyodkor players
Association football defenders
Uzbekistan Super League players
Footballers at the 2010 Asian Games
Asian Games competitors for Uzbekistan